Palaiochori (old form Palaiochorion) is a village in Chalkidiki, Greece, part of the municipality Aristotelis (municipality). It is situated between the villages Neochori (3 km, E), Megali Panagia (7 km, N) and Arnaia (5 km, W).

History
Neposi Castle (5th century )

The village is mentioned in a text from 1320 and 1441 (Actes de Xeropotamou, Archives de L'Athos III, ed. J. Bompaire.-Paris:1964). From 1478 to 1568 the population increased from c. 24 to c. 100 families.

In 1793 the French ambassador in Thessaloniki Esprit-Marie Cousinéry visited Palaiochori as is documented in 3 pages of Voyage dans la Macédonie.

In the Greek war of independence the village was destroyed by the Turks. In the civil war the village was destroyed 14 August 1948 by the communist rebels.

Churches
 Pammegiston Taxiarchon with wallpaintings, a copy of the icon Panagia Gorgoepikoos (the original in the monastery Docheiariou in Athos) and an icon from the 16th century of Taxiarchis Michail, near the church also is the statue of Ioakeim III Megaloprepis
 Agios Athanasios Athonitis church, festival 5 July each year
 Archangelos Michail church with a wallpainting

Persons

Most known probably is Giorgos Zorbas from Palaiochori who inspired the author Nikos Kazantzakis to write his work Alexis Zorbas. Giorgos Zorbas was born in Kolyndros in Pieria. (See the book of G. Anapliotis "Ο αληθινός Ζορμπάς και ο Ν. Καζαντζάκης" (The true Zorbas and Nikos Kazantzakis).

A central street is named after the leader of the Orthodox Church Bartholomew I who visited Paleochori in June 1999.

External links

 Palaiochori Chalkidikis - wikimapia 

Populated places in Chalkidiki

 
✓ Paleochori, Halkidiki